Jean-Luc Zephir (born 23 March 1993) is a Saint Lucian swimmer. Zephir represented his country at the 2020 Summer Olympics in the men's 100 metre freestyle event. He competed in the men's 100 metre freestyle event at the 2017 World Aquatics Championships. In 2019, Zephir was named to Saint Lucia's 2019 Pan American Games team.

In 2019, he represented Saint Lucia at the 2019 World Aquatics Championships held in Gwangju, South Korea and he competed in the men's 50 metre freestyle and men's 100 metre freestyle events. In both events he did not advance to compete in the semi-finals.

References

External links
 

1993 births
Living people
Saint Lucian male freestyle swimmers
Swimmers at the 2019 Pan American Games
Swimmers at the 2018 Commonwealth Games
Commonwealth Games competitors for Saint Lucia
Pan American Games competitors for Saint Lucia
Swimmers at the 2020 Summer Olympics
Olympic swimmers of Saint Lucia
Competitors at the 2018 Central American and Caribbean Games